John Steele may refer to:

Politics
 John Steele (Nova Scotia politician) (died c. 1762), surgeon and political figure in Nova Scotia
 John Steele (North Carolina politician) (1764–1815), U.S. Representative from North Carolina
 John Hardy Steele (1789–1865), Governor of New Hampshire
 John Nevett Steele (1796–1853), U.S. Congressman from Maryland
 John B. Steele (1814–1866), U.S. Representative from New York
 John Yellow Bird Steele, president of the Oglala Sioux Tribe

Sports
 John Steele (cricketer, born 1905) (1905–1990), English cricketer
 Johnny Steele (1916–2008), Scottish footballer and football manager
 John Steele (cricketer, born 1946), English cricketer
 John Steele (ski jumper) (1909-1996), American Olympic ski jumper

Other people
 John Steele (pioneer) (1821–1903), Mormon pioneer and doctor
 John Washington Steele (1843–1920), Coal Oil Johnny, oilman
 John Steele (paratrooper) (1912–1969), American paratrooper
 John Steele (oceanographer) (1926–2013), British oceanographer
 John E. Steele (born 1949), American judge

Other uses
 John Steele (comics), Marvel comics character
 John Steele, Adventurer, a 1940s radio program

See also
 Jack Steele (disambiguation)
 John Steel (disambiguation)
 Jonathan Steele (disambiguation)

Steele, John